The Russo-Turkish War of 1676–1681, a war between the Tsardom of Russia and Ottoman Empire, caused by Turkish expansionism in the second half of the 17th century.

Prelude
After having captured and devastated the region of Podolia in the course of the Polish–Turkish War of 1672–1676, the Ottoman government strove to spread its rule over all of Right-bank Ukraine with the support of its vassal (since 1669), Hetman Petro Doroshenko. The latter's pro-Turkish policy caused discontent among many Ukrainian Cossacks, which would lead to the election of Ivan Samoilovich (hetman of the Left-bank Ukraine) as the sole hetman of all Ukraine in 1674.

Despite this, Doroshenko continued to keep Chyhyryn, an important Cossack town near the Dnieper River. He cleverly maneuvered between Moscow and Warsaw and used the support of the Turkish-Tatar army. Finally, the Russian and Ukrainian forces under the command of Samoilovich and Grigory Romodanovsky besieged Chyhyryn and forced Doroshenko to surrender in 1676. Leaving a garrison in Chyhyryn, the Russian and Ukrainian armies retreated to the left bank of the Dnieper.

The supply of Ottoman forces operating in Moldavia and Wallachia was a major challenge that required well organized logistics. An army of 60,000 soldiers and 40,000 horses required a half-million kilograms of food per day. The Ottoman forces fared better than the Russians, but the expenses crippled both national treasuries. Supplies on both sides came using fixed prices, taxes, and confiscation.

1677 Campaign
The Ottoman Sultan Mehmed IV appointed Yuri Khmelnitsky, who had been the sultan's prisoner at that time, hetman of Right-bank Ukraine. In July 1677, the sultan ordered his army (45,000 men) under the command of Ibrahim Pasha to advance towards Chyhyryn. On 30 July 1677, advanced detachments appeared at the fortress, and on August 3 – the main Turkish forces. Samoilovich and Grigory Romodanovsky's army joined on August 10, and only on August 24 did they cross the Sula River on the way to Chyhyryn. On August 26–27, a skirmish between their and Ottoman troops removed Ottoman observation posts and allowed the rest of the Muscovite and Ukrainian forces to cross the river under the cover of artillery fire. Turkish attempts to drop back into the river at the first crossing detachment under the command of Major-General Shepelev were repulsed. Russian and Ukrainian cavalry attacked and overwhelmed the Turkish-Tatar army camp on August 28, inflicting heavy casualties. The following day, Ibrahim Pasha lifted the siege of Chyhyryn and hastily retreated to the Inhul River and beyond. Samoilovich and Grigory Romodanovsky relieved Chyhyryn on September 5. The Ottoman Army had lost 20,000 men and Ibrahim was imprisoned upon his return to Constantinople and Crimean Khan Selim I Giray lost his throne.

1678 Campaign

In July 1678, the Turkish army (approx. 70,000 men) of the Grand Vizier Kara Mustafa with the Crimean Tatar army (up to 50,000 men) besieged Chyhyryn once again. The Russian and Ukrainian armies (70,000–80,000) broke through the fortified position of the Turkish covering force and turned them to flight. Then they entrenched on the left bank of the Tiasmyn River opposite the fortress with the Turkish-Crimean army on the other bank. The crossings were destroyed and it was difficult to attack the Turks. The troops could freely enter Chyhyryn, but it was already surrounded by well-equipped siege positions and was heavily bombarded; its fortifications were badly damaged. When the Turks broke into the Lower Town of Chyhyryn on August 11, Romodanovsky ordered to leave the citadel and withdraw troops to the left bank. The Russian army retreated beyond the Dnieper, beating off the pursuing Turkish army, which would finally leave them in peace. Later the Turks seized Kanev and established the power of Yuri Khmelnitsky on Right-bank Ukraine, but did not go to Kiev, where the Russian troops were stationed.

In 1679–1680, the Russians repelled the attacks of the Crimean Tatars and signed the Bakhchisaray Peace Treaty on 3 January 1681, which would establish the Russo-Turkish border by the Dnieper.

Result of the war
The result of the war, which was ended by the Treaty of Bakhchisarai, is disputed. Some historians mention it was an Ottoman victory,{{efn|In the decades preceding the Ottomans’ attempted siege of Vienna in 1683 Ottoman armies had successfully prosecuted single-front wars.[..]..and Russia (the siege of Çehrin [Chyhyryn] in 1678).}} while another historian contends that it was a Russian victory. While some historians state the war was indecisive (stalemate).

Notes

References

Sources and further reading

 

Lewitter, Lucjan Ryszard. "The Russo-Polish Treaty of 1686 and Its Antecedents." Polish Review'' (1964): 5-29 online.

Conflicts in 1676
Conflicts in 1677
Conflicts in 1678
Conflicts in 1679
Conflicts in 1680
Conflicts in 1681
Military history of Ukraine
Russo-Turkish wars
Military operations involving the Crimean Khanate
17th century in the Zaporozhian Host
17th-century military history of Russia
1670s in Europe
1680s in Europe
1670s in the Ottoman Empire
1680s in the Ottoman Empire
1670s in Russia
1680s in Russia
1676 in Russia
1676 in the Ottoman Empire
1681 in the Ottoman Empire
Russian–Ukrainian wars